The 2022 Korean Curling Championships (branded as the 2022 KB Financial Korean Curling Championships), Korea's national curling championships, were held from June 11 to 17 at the Jincheon National Training Centre in Jincheon, South Korea. The winning teams on both the men's and women's sides became the Korean National Teams for the 2022–23 curling season. They will represent Korea at the 2022 Pan-Continental Curling Championships and later the 2023 World Women's Curling Championship and 2023 World Men's Curling Championship if they reach qualification. Both the men's and women's events were played in a round robin format which qualified four teams for the playoffs.

Heading into the event, the men's side was headed by the champions of the 2021 Korean Curling Championships, Gyeongbuk Sports Council, which is skipped by Kim Chang-min. During their reign as national champions, the team won gold at the 2021 Pacific-Asia Curling Championships and finished in eighth place at the 2022 World Men's Curling Championship with a 6–6 record. They also represented Korea at the 2021 Olympic Qualification Event, finishing in eighth with a 2–6 record. Expected challengers for the 2022 national title were Gangwon Province (Jeong Yeong-seok), Gyeonggido Curling Federation (Kim Jeong-min), Seoul City Hall (Jeong Byeong-jin) and Kyungil University (Lee Jae-beom).

The 2021 national champions Gangneung City Hall (Kim Eun-jung) lead the women's field of the 2022 championship. After a silver medal finish at the 2021 Pacific-Asia Curling Championships, the team reached the final of the 2022 World Women's Curling Championship where they lost to Switzerland's Silvana Tirinzoni. At the 2021 Olympic Qualification Event, Gangneung City Hall were successful in qualifying for the 2022 Winter Olympics as they finished the event with a 7–3 record. At the Games, they placed eighth with a 4–5 record. Gyeonggi Province (Gim Eun-ji) and Chuncheon City Hall (Ha Seung-youn) challenged for the 2022 title.

Summary
On the men's side, Seoul City Hall's team of Jeong Byeong-jin, Lee Jeong-jae, Kim Min-woo and Kim Tae-hwan won the title, defeating the reigning national champions Gyeongbuk Sports Council 7–3 in the final. Seoul City Hall went 6–1 through the round robin before winning both of their playoff matches to secure the title. The last time the team won the national title was in 2018.

The women's title was won by Chuncheon City Hall's Ha Seung-youn rink which defeated Gyeonggi Province's Gim Eun-ji 7–4 in the final. Ha, with Kim Hye-rin, Yang Tae-i and Kim Su-jin previously won the national title with former skip Kim Min-ji, who transferred to Gim's Gyeonggi Province team in March of 2022. Chuncheon City Hall went 5–1 in the round robin and then knocked off the reigning champions Gangneung City Hall's Kim Eun-jung team in the semifinal.

Men

Teams
The teams are listed as follows:

Round-robin standings
Final round-robin standings

Round-robin results

All draws are listed in Korea Standard Time (UTC+09:00).

Draw 2
Saturday, June 11, 14:00

Draw 4
Sunday, June 12, 9:00

Draw 6
Sunday, June 12, 19:00

Draw 8
Monday, June 13, 14:00

Draw 10
Tuesday, June 14, 9:00

Draw 12
Tuesday, June 14, 19:00

Draw 14
Wednesday, June 15, 14:00

Playoffs

Semifinals
Thursday, June 16, 14:00

Bronze medal game
Thursday, June 16, 19:00

Gold medal game
Friday, June 17, 14:00

Final standings

Women

Teams
The teams are listed as follows:

Round-robin standings
Final round-robin standings

Round-robin results

All draws are listed in Korea Standard Time (UTC+09:00).

Draw 1
Saturday, June 11, 9:00

Draw 3
Saturday, June 11, 19:00

Draw 5
Sunday, June 12, 14:00

Draw 7
Monday, June 13, 9:00

Draw 9
Monday, June 13, 19:00

Draw 11
Tuesday, June 14, 14:00

Draw 13
Wednesday, June 15, 9:00

Playoffs

Semifinals
Thursday, June 16, 9:00

Bronze medal game
Thursday, June 16, 19:00

Gold medal game
Friday, June 17, 9:00

Final standings

See also
2022 Korean Mixed Doubles Curling Championship

References

External links
Korean Curling Media (@curling1spoon) on Instagram

2022 in curling
Sport in North Chungcheong Province
2022 in South Korean sport
June 2022 sports events in South Korea
Jincheon County